The Akhmat Arena is a multi-use stadium in Grozny, Chechnya, Russia, named after former President of the Chechen Republic Akhmad Kadyrov.  It was completed in May 2011, and is used mostly for football matches. The stadium hosts home matches of FC Akhmat Grozny.  The stadium was designed with a capacity of 30,000 spectators.  It replaced Sultan Bilimkhanov Stadium as the home of FC Terek. The grand opening took place on 11 May 2011. The first competitive match in Akhmat Stadium took place on 20 May 2011.

References

External links
Official website
Stadium information
Photos of stadium under construction

Football venues in Russia
FC Akhmat Grozny
Buildings and structures in Grozny
Sports venues completed in 2011
Sport in Grozny